Anoplius depressipes is a species of spider wasp in the family Pompilidae. It is a known predator of fishing spiders from the genus Dolomedes, and the wasp is highly adept at walking on the surface of water.

References

External links

 

Pompilinae
Articles created by Qbugbot